Parisian Women (German: Pariserinnen) is a 1921 German silent film directed by Léo Lasko and starring Ressel Orla, Xenia Desni and Ralph Arthur Roberts. The film's sets were designed by the art director Robert Herlth and Walter Röhrig. It premiered at the Marmorhaus in Berlin.

Cast
 Ressel Orla as Lolotte (Lou) 
 Xenia Desni as Philine 
 Ralph Arthur Roberts as Dieider 
 Paul Bildt
 Emil Albes as Marcellier 
 Lydia Potechina as Marcelliers Frau 
 Ivan Bulatov
 Lia Eibenschütz
 John Gottowt as Aristide 
 Wilhelm Diegelmann
 Heinrich Peer
 Ernst Hofmann as Georges 
 Fritz Junkermann as Baptiste 
 Eugen Klöpfer as Gaston 
 Paul Otto as Baron de Rieux 
 Else Berna as Margot 
 Loni Nest as Rose 
 Karl Falkenberg as Sohn des Barons

References

Bibliography
 Alfred Krautz. International directory of cinematographers, set- and costume designers in film, Volume 4. Saur, 1984.

External links

1921 films
Films of the Weimar Republic
German silent feature films
Films directed by Léo Lasko
German black-and-white films